Belle Chen (born 17 August 1988) is an Australian-Taiwanese pianist, composer, and producer based in London, United Kingdom.

Biography 
Born in Kaohsiung, Taiwan and raised in Brisbane, Australia, Chen was a national finalist of Australian National Piano Award in 2010. In 2011, she relocated to London to study at Royal Academy of Music, and it was during this time that Chen began experimenting with integrating sound art with classical music. In 2015, Chen was voted as the winner of Classical Rising Star Award at London Music Awards. She has appeared on BBC Radio 3, BBC China, Monocle 24, BBC World Service, ABC FM, Finland Classic Radio, Macroview TV Taiwan, amongst others.

Chen's works have been described as "original and provocative" by Brian Eno and selected as the winner of Curator's Choice for Music Award at 2014 NOISE Festival. With her newfound musical style, Chen debuted as BBC Introducing artist at 2016 Latitude Festival. Max Reinhardt, who saw Chen's performance on BBC Introducing Stage, described her as "a revelation" on BBC Radio 6. In 2016, Chen performed at Royal Festival Hall for BBC Radio 3's 70th Anniversary Celebration.

In 2018, Chen was one of nine jury-selected showcase artists to perform at 2018 Classical:NEXT at De Doelen, where she appears in the representation of Australia and the United Kingdom, and thereby becoming the first Australian artist to perform at the world's largest global art music conference. In the same year, Chen is elected as Associate of Royal Academy of Music for significant contribution to the music profession.

In 2019, Chen was nominated for Australian Music Prize for her experimental classical album ‘Departure.’ In the same year, she sat on the judging panel for the prestigious Paul Hamlyn Foundation Award for Composers.

Discography

Solo recordings  

 Listen, London: First Impression (2014)
 Mediterranean Sounds (2016)
 Mademoiselle (2017)
 Departure (2019)
 Destinations (2020)
 Late Night Sessions: At Home (2020)
 Late Night Sessions: The Storyteller (2021)
 Late Night Sessions: New Dawn (2021)
 The Stone Nest Live Session (2021)

References 

Australian pianists
Australian women pianists
1988 births
Living people
Australian people of Taiwanese descent
Alumni of the Royal Academy of Music
21st-century pianists
21st-century women pianists